The Porter from Maxim's (French: Le chasseur de chez Maxim's) is a 1933 French comedy film directed by Karl Anton and starring Tramel, Suzy Vernon and Robert Burnier. It is one of several film adaptations of the 1923 French play of the same title.

It was made at the Joinville Studios by the French branch of Paramount Pictures.

Cast
Tramel as Julien  
Suzy Vernon as Geneviève Pauphilat
Robert Burnier as Le marquis du Vélin
Mireille Perrey as Totoche
Charles Siblot as La Chanoine
Marguerite Moreno as Mme. Pauphitat
Dany Lorys as Cricri
Pierre Moreno as La Giclais
Pierre Stéphen as Octave
Georges Cahuzac as Cruchot
Ritou Lancyle
Denise Dorian
Madeleine Lebergy
Yves Mirande

References

External links

French comedy films
1933 comedy films
Films directed by Karl Anton
Films set in Paris
French films based on plays
Films shot at Joinville Studios
Films scored by Casimir Oberfeld
Remakes of French films
Sound film remakes of silent films
French black-and-white films
1930s French films